The A48(M) motorway in Wales links Cardiff with Newport. At St Mellons, it runs continuously into the dual-carriageway A48, which also features  (albeit narrow) hard shoulders. The A48(M) has no junctions and opened in 1977. The M4 was extended from junction 29 in 1980.

Previous A48(M) motorways
The  Port Talbot bypass which opened in 1966, was numbered A48(M) before its incorporation into the westward extension of the M4 in the 1970s. Some maps show the Morriston bypass section of the M4 as also having been originally numbered A48(M), although whether this number was ever used on the ground has been questioned.

References

External links

 
 CBRD Motorway Database – A48(M)
 Pathetic Motorways – A48(M)

Motorways in Wales
Transport in Newport, Wales
Transport in Cardiff